The Libera Award for Marketing Genius is an award presented by the American Association of Independent Music at the annual Libera Award which recognizes "the most innovative and creative marketing campaign for a project released by an Independent label or artist" since 2012. The category was known as Light Bulb Award in 2012 to 2014.

Winners and nominees

References

External links

Marketing Genius